The United Kingdom Census 1971 was a census of the United Kingdom of Great Britain and Northern Ireland carried out on 25 April 1971. The census will be released after 100 years.

According to the preliminary general results of the census, the population of the United Kingdom on 25 April 1971 was as follows:

See also
Census in the United Kingdom
List of United Kingdom censuses

References

1971
Census
April 1971 events in the United Kingdom